The 1985 North Texas State Mean Green football team was an American football team that represented North Texas State University (now known as the University of North Texas) during the 1985 NCAA Division I-AA football season as a member of the Southland Conference. In their fourth year under head coach Corky Nelson, the team compiled a 4–6–1 record.

Schedule

References

North Texas State
North Texas Mean Green football seasons
North Texas State Mean Green football